Peter McPharland was a Grey Cup champion Canadian Football League player. He was a running back.

McPharland played his junior football with the powerhouse St. Michael's College team. He joined his hometown Toronto Argonauts in 1948, playing a game when Joe Krol and Royal Copeland were injured. In 1949 he was an integral part of the Montreal Alouettes first Grey Cup championship, playing 3 regular season games but getting "plenty of work" in the playoffs.

References

Living people
Montreal Alouettes players
Toronto Argonauts players
Year of birth missing (living people)